George Ralph Richardson Cockburn (14 February 1834 – 18 January 1912) was a Scottish-born educator and political figure in Ontario, Canada. He represented Toronto Centre in the House of Commons of Canada from 1887 to 1896 as a Conservative member.

He was born in Edinburgh and was educated in Scotland, graduating from the University of Edinburgh and continuing his studies in Germany. Cockburn taught in Scotland for several years. In 1834, he married Mary Zane. In 1858, he came to Canada West as rector for the Model Grammar School for Upper Canada. Cockburn was named principal for Upper Canada College in 1861. Cockburn was unsuccessful when he ran for reelection in 1896. He was president of the Toronto Land and Investment Company and a director for the Ontario Bank, the London and Canadian Loan and Agency Company and the Glasgow and London Insurance Company. Cockburn also served as a member of the senate for the University of Toronto.

References 

 
 

1834 births
1912 deaths
Members of the House of Commons of Canada from Ontario
Conservative Party of Canada (1867–1942) MPs
Scottish emigrants to pre-Confederation Ontario
Alumni of the University of Edinburgh
Immigrants to the Province of Canada